A vicious circle is a complex of events that reinforces itself through a feedback loop.

Vicious circle or Vicious Circle may also refer to:

Music 
 Vicious Circle (band), an Australian hardcore punk band formed in 1983
 American NJ Death/Thrash Metal band formed in 1988
 Australian hardcore band formed 1982
 Vicious Circle (L.A. Guns album) (1995)
 Vicious Circle (Zero Boys album) (1982)
 Vicious Circle, a punk rock band featuring Jack Grisham, Todd Barnes, Steve Houston and Laddy Tirrell, whose members later formed the band True Sounds of Liberty (1978)
 Vicious Circle, a 1989 album by The Vibrators
 "Vicious Circle", a 1981 single by Abrasive Wheels
 "Vicious Circle", a song by Lou Reed from Rock and Roll Heart
 "Vicious Circle", a song by Quiet Riot from Guilty Pleasures
 "Vicious Circles", a song by Aaron Lewis from Town Line

Film 
 The Vicious Circle (1948 film), a film starring Conrad Nagel
 The Vicious Circle (1957 film), a film starring John Mills
 Vicious Circle (2008 film), a 2008 drama film by Paul Boyd
 Vicious Circle, a name for the Algonquin Round Table in the 1994 film Mrs. Parker and the Vicious Circle

Television
 Dane Cook: Vicious Circle, an HBO comedy special featuring Dane Cook
 "Vicious Circle", a 1957 episode of Alfred Hitchcock Presents

Other uses 
 Vicious Circle, a painting by Polish Symbolist painter Jacek Malczewski
 Vicious Circle (comics), a fictional character group in Savage Dragon
 Vicious Cycle Software, a company

See also 
 The Vicious Circle (disambiguation)
 Vicious Cycle (album), a 2003 album by Lynyrd Skynyrd
 Vicious Circle (novel), a 2013 novel by Wilbur Smith.